José Eduardo Nehin (born in San Juan, Argentina, October 13, 1905, death on December 16, 1957) was an Argentine footballer who played as a midfielder for Argentina in the 1934 FIFA World Cup. He also played for Sportivo Desamparados.

Nehin's father was one of the founders of Sportivo Desamparados, and he would begin his amateur football career with the club. Nehin helped the club win its first title, the Liga Sanjuanina de fútbol in 1928. His performances for Desamparados led to Nehin's selection to the national team that competed at the 1934 FIFA World Cup finals, where he would captain the side.

Nehin made his living as a cooper.

Fifa World Cup Career

References

External links
FIFA profile

Argentine footballers
Argentine people of Syrian descent
Argentina international footballers
Association football midfielders
Syrian Christians
1934 FIFA World Cup players
1905 births
1957 deaths
People from San Juan, Argentina
Sportspeople from San Juan Province, Argentina